Eucalyptus muelleriana, commonly known as yellow stringybark, is a species of medium-sized to tall tree that is endemic to southeastern Australia. It has rough, stingy bark on the trunk and branches, lance-shaped to curved adult leaves, flower buds in groups of between seven and eleven, white flowers and cup-shaped to shortened spherical fruit.

Description
It has rough, stringy, greyish bark from the base of the trunk to the thinnest branches. Flowering occurs between January and May and the flowers are white.

Taxonomy and naming
Eucalyptus muelleriana was first formally described in 1891 by Alfred William Howitt in Transactions of the Royal Society of Victoria. The specific epithet honours Ferdinand von Mueller.

Distribution and habitat
Yellow stringbark grows in wet forests on coastal plains, ranges and escarpments from Wollongong in New South Wales to Wilsons Promontory in Victoria. It has also been planted in New Zealand.

Uses
Yellow stringbark provides a valuable timber which is strong, durable, straight-grained and has been widely used, particularly in Victoria for posts and piles.

See also
 List of Eucalyptus species

References

Flora of New South Wales
Flora of Victoria (Australia)
Trees of Australia
muelleriana
Myrtales of Australia
Plants described in 1891